The 1944 season was Wisła Krakóws 36th year as a club.

Friendlies

Okupacyjne Mistrzostwa Krakowa

External links
1944 Wisła Kraków season at historiawisly.pl

Wisła Kraków seasons
Association football clubs 1944 season
Wisla